Romane Dicko (born 30 September 1999) is a French judoka. In 2021, she won one of the bronze medals in the women's +78 kg event at the 2020 Summer Olympics held in Tokyo, Japan. She is also a two-time gold medalist at the European Judo Championships and she won gold in her event at the 2021 Judo World Masters held in Doha, Qatar.

Career
She won the gold medal in the women's +78 kg event at the 2020 European Judo Championships held in Prague, Czech Republic.

In 2021, she won the gold medal in her event at the Judo World Masters held in Doha, Qatar. A month later, she won the gold medal in her event at the 2021 Judo Grand Slam Tel Aviv held in Tel Aviv, Israel.

She represented France at the 2020 Summer Olympics in Tokyo, Japan. She won the bronze medal in her match against Kayra Sayit of Turkey. She also won the gold medal in the mixed team event.

She won the silver medal in her event at the 2022 Judo Grand Slam Paris held in Paris, France. She won the gold medal in her event at the 2022 Judo Grand Slam Tel Aviv held in Tel Aviv, Israel.

Achievements

References

External links

 
 
 

Living people
1999 births
Place of birth missing (living people)
French female judoka
Judoka at the 2020 Summer Olympics
Olympic judoka of France
Medalists at the 2020 Summer Olympics
Olympic medalists in judo
Olympic gold medalists for France
Olympic bronze medalists for France
21st-century French women